The 2013–14 Euroleague Qualifying rounds were played from October 1, 2013 until October 4, 2013. Eight teams participated in a knock-out tournament format to conquer a spot in the 2013–14 Euroleague. Lietuvos rytas advanced as the winner of the qualifying rounds to the Euroleague Regular Season. All games were played in the Siemens Arena in Vilnius.

Teams
The eight teams are:

  Banvit B (2)
  Lietuvos Rytas B (2)
  EWE Baskets Oldenburg B (2)
  Telenet Oostende B (1)
  ČEZ Nymburk B (1)
  VEF Rīga B (1)
  Khimki WC (3)
  Cimberio Varese WC (3)

Draw
The draw for the 2013–14 Turkish Airlines Euroleague qualifying rounds was held on Thursday, 4 July.
Teams were seeded into four pots of two teams in accordance with the Club Ranking, based on their performance in European competitions during a three-year period, and the teams granted a Wild Card by ECA were seeded above the rest of the teams.

Bracket

First qualifying round

Second qualifying round

Third qualifying round

References

2013–14 Euroleague